The 2007 Speedway World Cup (SWC) was the 7th FIM Speedway World Cup season. The Final took place on July 21, 2007 in the Alfred Smoczyk Stadium in Leszno, Poland. The tournament was won by host team Poland (55 pts) and they beat defending champion Denmark (52 pts), Australia (29 pts) and Great Britain (15 pts) in the Final.

Qualification

Tournament

Final classification

See also
 2007 Speedway Grand Prix
 2007 Team Speedway Junior World Championship

References

 
World Team
2007
Speedway 2007
2007 in speedway